Thymidine diphosphate glucose (often abbreviated dTDP-glucose or TDP-glucose) is a nucleotide-linked sugar consisting of deoxythymidine diphosphate linked to glucose. It is the starting compound for the syntheses of many deoxysugars.

Biosynthesis

DTDP-glucose is produced by the enzyme glucose-1-phosphate thymidylyltransferase and is synthesized from dTTP and glucose-1-phosphate. Pyrophosphate is a byproduct of the reaction.

Uses within the cell

DTDP-glucose goes on to form a variety of compounds in nucleotide sugars metabolism. Many bacteria utilize dTDP-glucose to form exotic sugars that are incorporated into their lipopolysaccharides or into secondary metabolites such as antibiotics. During the syntheses of many of these exotic sugars, dTDP-glucose undergoes a combined oxidation/reduction reaction  via the enzyme dTDP-glucose 4,6-dehydratase, producing dTDP-4-keto-6-deoxy-glucose.

References

Biochemistry
Nucleotides
Monosaccharides